Sargents Creek is a  long 1st order tributary to the Hyco River in Person County, North Carolina.  Sargents Creek joins the Hyco River within Hyco Lake.

Course
Sargents Creek rises in a pond about 0.25 miles north of Olive Hill, North Carolina and then flows north-northwest to join the Hyco River about 4 miles east-southeast of Semora.

Watershed
Sargents Creek drains  of area, receives about 46.3 in/year of precipitation, has a wetness index of 438.41, and is about 46% forested.

References

Rivers of North Carolina
Rivers of Person County, North Carolina
Tributaries of the Roanoke River